was a warrior of the mid-Heian period.

According to Otogizōshi stories compiled several centuries later, Sadamitsu was a retainer of the Japanese legendary hero Minamoto no Raikō. Sadamitsu is known as one of The Four Guardian Kings under Raikō. Alternatively, in Konjaku Monogatari he is listed as one of three retainers to Raikō. Following the Tale of the Ground Spider within the tale of Raikō, Sadamitsu personally protected Raikō when he was suffering a mysterious ailment. Sadamitsu is also depicted in artwork and kabuki plays.
At times Sadamitsu is depicted as female.

In the fairy story Kintaro, he was given the role to find Kintaro on Ashigarayama (Mt. Ashigara) by disguising himself as a logger and took him to meet Minamoto no Yorimitsu. https://japanese-wiki-corpus.github.io/person/Sadamitsu%20USUI.html

References

Samurai